The Metonic cycle or enneadecaeteris (from , from ἐννεακαίδεκα, "nineteen") is a period of almost exactly 19 years after which the lunar phases recur at the same time of the year. The recurrence is not perfect, and by precise observation the Metonic cycle defined as 235 synodic months is just 2 hours, 4 minutes and 58 seconds longer than 19 tropical years. Meton of Athens, in the 5th century BC, judged the cycle to be a whole number of days, 6,940. Using these whole numbers facilitates the construction of a lunisolar calendar.

A tropical year is longer than 12 lunar months and shorter than 13 of them. The arithmetic identity 12×12 + 7×13 = 235 shows that a combination of 12 "short" years (12 months) and 7 "long" years (13 months) will be almost exactly  equal to 19 solar years.

Application in traditional calendars
In the Babylonian and Hebrew lunisolar calendars, the years 3, 6, 8, 11, 14, 17, and 19 are the long (13-month) years of the Metonic cycle. This cycle forms the basis of the Greek and Hebrew calendars. A 19-year cycle is used for the computation of the date of Easter each year.

The Babylonians applied the 19-year cycle from the late sixth century BC.

According to Livy, the second king of Rome, Numa Pompilius (reigned 715–673 BC), inserted intercalary months in such a way that "in the twentieth year the days should fall in with the same position of the sun from which they had started." As "the twentieth year" takes place nineteen years after "the first year", this seems to indicate that the Metonic cycle was applied to Numa's calendar.

Diodorus Siculus reports that Apollo is said to have visited the Hyperboreans once every 19 years.

The Metonic cycle has been implemented in the Antikythera mechanism which offers unexpected evidence for the popularity of the calendar based on it.

The (19-year) Metonic cycle is a lunisolar cycle, as is the (76-year) Callippic cycle. An important example of an application of the Metonic cycle in the Julian calendar is the 19-year lunar cycle insofar as provided with a Metonic structure. In the following century, Callippus developed the Callippic cycle of four 19-year periods for a 76-year cycle with a mean year of exactly 365.25 days.

Around AD 260 the Alexandrian computist Anatolius, who became bishop of Laodicea in AD 268, was the first to devise a method for determining the date of Easter Sunday. However, it was some later, somewhat different, version of the Metonic 19-year lunar cycle which, as the basic structure of Dionysius Exiguus’ and also of Bede’s Easter table, would ultimately prevail throughout Christendom, at least until in the year 1582, when the Gregorian calendar was introduced.

The Celts knew the Metonic cycle thousands of years ago, as evidenced by artifacts such as the Knowth Calendar Stone. It was almost certainly the basis for the 19-year so-called Celtic Great Year.

The Runic calendar is a perpetual calendar based on the 19-year-long Metonic cycle. It is also known as a Rune staff or Runic Almanac. This calendar does not rely on knowledge of the duration of the tropical year or of the occurrence of leap years. It is set at the beginning of each year by observing the first full moon after the winter solstice. The oldest one known, and the only one from the Middle Ages, is the Nyköping staff, which is believed to date from the 13th century.

The Bahá'í calendar, established during the middle of the 19th century, is also based on cycles of 19 solar years.

Hebrew calendar
A Small Maḥzor (Hebrew מחזור, meaning "cycle") is a 19-year cycle in the lunisolar calendar system used by the Jewish people. It is similar to, but slightly different in usage with, the Greek Metonic cycle, and likely derived from or alongside the much earlier Babylonian calendar.

Three ancient civilizations (Babylonia, China and Israel) used lunisolar calendars and knew of the rule of the intercalation from as early as 2000 BC. Whether or not the correlation indicates cause-and-effect relationship is an open question.

Polynesia
It is possible that the Polynesian kilo-hoku (astronomers) discovered the Metonic cycle in the same way Meton had, by trying to make the month fit the year.

Mathematical basis

The Metonic cycle is the most accurate cycle of time less than 100 years for synchronizing the tropical year and the lunar month, when the method of synchronizing is the intercalation of a thirteenth lunar month in a calendar year from time to time.
Tropical year = 365.2422 days. 
365.2422 x 19 = 6,939.602 days (every 19 years)
Synodic month = 29.53059 days.
29.53059 x 235 = 6,939.689 days (every 235 months)
19 years of 12 synodic months = 228 synodic months per cycle, 7 months short of the 235 months needed to achieve synchronization.

The traditional lunar year of 12 synodic months is about 354 days, approximately 11 days short of the solar year.  Thus, every 2-3 years there is an accumulated discrepancy of approximately a full synodic month. In order to 'catch up' to this discrepancy, to maintain seasonal consistency and to prevent dramatic shifts over time, seven intercalary months are added (one at a time), at intervals of every 2-3 years during the course of 19 solar years.

The difference between 19 solar years and 235 synodic months is only about two hours, or 0.087 days.

See also
 Octaeteris (8-year cycle of antiquity)
 Callippic cycle (76-year cycle from 330 BC)
 Hipparchic cycle (304-year cycle from 2nd century BC)
 Saros cycle of eclipses
 Attic and Byzantine calendar
 Julian day
 Date of Easter ("the Computus")

Notes

References

External links

Eclipses, Cosmic Clockwork of the Ancients 

Ancient Greek astronomy
Time in astronomy
Periodic phenomena
Calendars